Hook, line and sinker may refer to:

 Hook, line and sinker, an English-language idiom
 Hook, line and sinker, a type of fishing equipment
 Hook, Line and Sinker (1930 film), a slapstick comedy starring Wheeler & Woolsey
 Hook, Line & Sinker (1969 film), a comedy starring Jerry Lewis
 Hook, Line and Sinker (Transformers), fictional characters in Marvel publications
 Hook, Line and Sinker (TV program), Australian television fishing show

See also 
 Hook, Lion and Sinker
 Hook, Line and Stinker, a 1958 Looney Tunes cartoon featuring Wile E. Coyote and the Road Runner